The 1941 South Australian National Football League season was the 62nd season of the top-level Australian rules football competition in South Australia.

Ladder

Finals series

Grand Final

References 

SANFL
South Australian National Football League seasons